Paropesia is a genus of flies in the family Tachinidae.

Species
 Paropesia nigra Mesnil, 1970

References

Tachinidae